The Wild Blue: The Novel of the U.S. Air Force, by historian Walter J. Boyne and Steven L. Thompson, was published in 1986.

This book follows the fictitious careers and lives of members of the United States Air Force, from their first meeting at Basic Training until they leave the Air Force.

References

"The Wild Blue"
"The Wild Blue: The Novel of the U.S. Air Force"

1986 books
History books about World War II
Aviation novels